Vojvodinci is a village in Serbia. It is situated in the Vršac municipality, South Banat District, Vojvodina province. The village has a Romanian ethnic majority (87.76%) and its population numbering 328 people (2011 census).

Name
In Serbian, the village is known as Vojvodinci (Војводинци), in Romanian as Voivodinț, in Hungarian as Vajdalak, and in German as Wojwodintz.

Historical population

1961: 1,012
1971: 902
1981: 727
1991: 593
2002: 417
2011: 328

Climate 
The warmest month in Vojvodinci is July, with an average temperature of 21.7 °C. In contrast, the coldest month is January, with an average temperature of 0.4 °C.

References

Slobodan Ćurčić, Broj stanovnika Vojvodine, Novi Sad, 1996.

See also
List of places in Serbia
List of cities, towns and villages in Vojvodina

Vršac
Populated places in Serbian Banat
Populated places in South Banat District
Romanian communities in Serbia